48 may refer to: 
 48 (number)
 one of the years 48 BC, AD 48, 1948, 2048
 48 (novel)
 '48 (magazine)
 "48", a song by Tyler, the Creator from the album Wolf
 48, a phone network brand of Three Ireland
 "Forty Eight", a song by Karma to Burn from the album V, 2011

See also
 A48 (disambiguation)